The 1998 WCHA Men's Ice Hockey Tournament was the 39th conference playoff in league history and 46th season where a WCHA champion was crowned. The tournament was played between March 13 and March 21, 1998. First round games were played at home team campus sites while all 'Final Five' matches were held at the Bradley Center in Milwaukee, Wisconsin. By winning the tournament, Wisconsin was awarded the Broadmoor Trophy and received the WCHA's automatic bid to the 1998 NCAA Division I Men's Ice Hockey Tournament.

Format
The first round of the postseason tournament featured a best-of-three games format. All nine conference teams participated in the tournament as did Mankato State which was slated to join the WCHA as a full member in two years. Teams were seeded No. 1 through No. 9 according to their final conference standing, with a tiebreaker system used to seed teams with an identical number of points accumulated while Mankato State was seeded tenth. The top five seeded teams each earned home ice and hosted one of the lower seeded teams.

The winners of the first round series advanced to the Bradley Center for the WCHA Final Five, the collective name for the quarterfinal, semifinal, and championship rounds. The Final Five uses a single-elimination format. Teams were re-seeded No. 1 through No. 5 according to the final regular season conference standings, with the top three teams automatically advancing to the semifinals and the remaining two playing in a quarterfinal game. The semifinal pitted the top remaining seed against the winner of the quarterfinal game while the two other teams that received byes were matched against one another with the winners advancing to the championship game and the losers meeting in a Third Place contest. The Tournament Champion received an automatic bid to the 1998 NCAA Division I Men's Ice Hockey Tournament.

Conference standings
Note: GP = Games played; W = Wins; L = Losses; T = Ties; PTS = Points; GF = Goals For; GA = Goals Against

Bracket
Teams are reseeded after the first round

Note: * denotes overtime period(s)

Quarterfinals

(1) North Dakota vs. (10) Mankato State

(2) Wisconsin vs. (9) Alaska-Anchorage

(3) Colorado College vs. (8) Denver

(4) St. Cloud State vs. (7) Michigan Tech

(5) Minnesota-Duluth vs. (6) Minnesota

Quarterfinal

(4) St. Cloud State vs. (5) Minnesota-Duluth

Semifinals

(1) North Dakota vs. (4) St. Cloud State

(2) Wisconsin vs. (3) Colorado College

Third Place

(3) Colorado College vs. (4) St. Cloud State

Championship

(1) North Dakota vs. (2) Wisconsin

Tournament awards

All-Tournament Team
F Joe Bianchi* (Wisconsin)
F Jason Blake (North Dakota)
F Stewart Bodtker (Colorado College)
D Curtis Murphy (North Dakota)
D Matt Peterson (Wisconsin)
G Graham Melanson (Wisconsin)
* Most Valuable Player(s)

See also
Western Collegiate Hockey Association men's champions

References

External links
WCHA.com
1997–98 WCHA Standings
1997–98 NCAA Standings
2012–13 Alaska-Anchorage Seawolves Media Guide
2013–14 Colorado College Tigers Media Guide
2013–14 Denver Pioneers Media Guide
2013–14 Minnesota Golden Gophers Media Guide 
2012–13 Minnesota-Duluth Bulldogs Media Guide
2013–14 North Dakota Hockey Media Guide
2011–12 St. Cloud State Huskies Media Guide
2003–04 Wisconsin Badgers Media Guide

WCHA Men's Ice Hockey Tournament
Wcha Men's Ice Hockey Tournament